Une Fenêtre ouverte is a 2005 documentary film.

Synopsis 
Can madness be described? Is it possible to express the pain that it entails? In 1994, when she was about to fall prey to her illness, Khady Sylla met Aminta Ngom, who exhibited her madness freely, without fear of provocation. During her years of suffering, Aminta was her window to the world.

Awards 
 Filmer à tout prix – Bruxelles 2006
 Vue sur les Docs – Marseille 2005

External links
 

2005 films
Senegalese documentary films
French documentary films
2005 documentary films
Documentary films about mental disorders
2000s French films